Matteo Salvi (born 20 March 1999) is an Italian footballer who plays as a defender.

Club career
He spent most of his youth career with Empoli youth teams before transferring to Pisa in 2015. During the 2016–17 Serie B season, he received several call-ups to Pisa's senior squad, but did not see any field time. In the summer 2017, he moved to Atalanta youth squads. For the 2018–19 season, he was loaned to SPAL. He played for the youth team there, receiving one call-up to the senior squad for a Coppa Italia game.

On 10 July 2019, he joined Serie C club Pontedera on a season-long loan. He made his professional Serie C debut for Pontedera on 20 October 2019 in a game against Como. He substituted Daniele Mannini in the 83rd minute.

On 26 August 2020 he joined Pistoiese on loan. On 22 July 2021 he was loaned to Grosseto.

References

External links
 
 

1999 births
Living people
People from Pontedera
Sportspeople from the Province of Pisa
Italian footballers
Association football defenders
Serie C players
Pisa S.C. players
Atalanta B.C. players
S.P.A.L. players
U.S. Città di Pontedera players
U.S. Pistoiese 1921 players
U.S. Grosseto 1912 players
Footballers from Tuscany